The 2013–14 Algerian Basketball Cup is the 45th edition of the Algerian Basketball Cup. It was managed by the FABB and was held in Algiers, in the Hacène Harcha Arena on June 7, 2014.

Round of 32

Round of 16

Bracket

Final

References

External links
basketalgerie.com

Algerian Basketball Cup
2014 in Algerian sport